This article is a list of films produced, distributed or sponsored by the Children's Film Foundation.

Films

As UK distributor or translator 
 The Big Fish ; original (Czech): Dobrodružství na Zlaté zátoce (1955)
 The Brno Trail; original (Czech): Táňa a dva Pistolníci (1967)
 Caroline Steps out; original (French)?
 Danger on the Danube; original: Négyen az árban (1961) 
 The Intruders (1969)
 Kekec (originally Yugoslavian production) (1963)
 The Mysterious Wreck; original (German): Das Geheimnisvolle Wrack (1954)
 Ptisi Dolitat Do Nas (1971)

Sources 
 The Children’s Film Foundation – TV Cream
 Rank Film Library - 16mm Entertainment Film Catalogue 1978-79
 Children's Film Foundation

External links 
 With Children's Film Foundation (CFF) (Sorted by Popularity Ascending)
 Children's Film and Television Foundation - Home Page - Children's Film and Television Foundation official website

References

 
Filmographies